Horní Jelení is a town in Pardubice District in the Pardubice Region of the Czech Republic. It has about 2,100 inhabitants.

Administrative parts
Villages of Dolní Jelení and Rousínov are administrative parts of Horní Jelení.

Notable people
Karel Kaplan (1928–2023), historian

References

External links

 

Cities and towns in the Czech Republic
Populated places in Pardubice District